KKPZ (1330 AM, "The Truth") was a radio station broadcasting a religious radio format. Licensed to Portland, Oregon, United States, it served the greater Portland metro area. The station was owned by KPHP Radio, Inc. (Crawford Broadcasting Company), located in Happy Valley, Oregon.

History
The station was first licensed, as KTBR on 1140 kHz, on September 21, 1925 to Brown's Radio Shop at 172 Tenth Street in Portland.

In 1932, the station (then broadcasting on 1330 kHz with 500 watts of power) was purchased by the management of KOIN, and the call letters were changed to KALE. A story in a trade publication noted that KALE "will broadcast CBS sustaining features which KOIN cannot handle." The station's call letters were changed to KPOJ effective June 6, 1948, the date on which sister station KPOJ-FM began broadcasting. The stations were owned and operated by The Oregon Journal.

On June 9, 1970, KPOJ changed callsigns to KPOK and switched to a "Pop Tunes and Oldies" format.  On January 24, 1972 KPOK switched from "Pop Tunes and Oldies" to oldies as "The Golden Sound". On June 18, 1973, KPOK switched from oldies "The Golden Sound" to "Cross-Country" (a mixture of modern country and top hits). On August 16, 1976, KPOK switched from "Rockin' Country" to beautiful music and changed call letters to KUPL. In March 1984, KUPL changed formats from adult standards (as "Music of Your Life") to country.

On November 1, 1995, KUPL changed its callsigs to KKPZ and switched to a religious format.

KKPZ ceased broadcasting on April 30, 2021. Crawford Broadcasting put KKPZ and FM translator station 97.5 K248DD up for sale, but KKPZ's license was cancelled by the Federal Communications Commission on September 28, 2021. Due to that, K248DD started simulcasting KLVP. The property was sold for development into multi-family housing.

References

External links
FCC Station Search Details: DKKPZ (Facility ID: 4113)
FCC History Cards for KKPZ (covering 1927-1981 as KTBR / KALE / KPOJ / KPOK / KUPL)

KPZ
KPZ
Radio stations established in 1925
1925 establishments in Oregon
Radio stations disestablished in 2021
2021 disestablishments in Oregon
Defunct radio stations in the United States
Defunct religious radio stations in the United States
KPZ